Chesley (originally Sconeville) is a community in Bruce County, Ontario, Canada, located within the municipality of Arran–Elderslie. The name Sconeville was replaced in 1868 to mark the career of Solomon Chesley, an official in the pre-Confederation Indian Department. Its town slogan is "The Nicest Town Around." Chesley is located north of both Walkerton on Bruce Road 19 and Hanover on County Road 10.

The town was named after Solomon Chesley, a former official in the Indian Department in Canada West. It is now an example of a typical rural Ontario community.

Chesley originally developed around mills built on the Saugeen River around 1858. It expanded further when it was connected to the Grand Trunk Railway in 1881. A great fire destroyed most of the original downtown core in 1888, and the destroyed wood buildings were replaced by brick and stone.

From 1877 to 2004, the town had a weekly newspaper called The Chesley Enterprise.

The town's major source of employment is commercial manufacturing. From 1886 to 1987, the Krug family operated the Krug Bros. furniture manufacturing business. Currently Crate Designs, a locally owned furniture manufacturing factory, is the only surviving furniture factory, following the recent downsizing of Durham Furniture (2007).

Chesley is part of the Bluewater District School Board and has a junior kindergarten to grade 8 school called the Chesley District Community School. In 2014, the original Chesley District High School joined with the Kinghurst Community School to form a junior kindergarten to grade 12 facility. In 2017, the high school section closed and it is now a junior kindergarten to grade 8 facility.

A number of franchises also exist in the town, including New Orleans Pizza, Rona, Home Hardware, and Rexall Drugs.

The town is known for the statue of a giant bull on the north end of town, which is affectionately known as "Big Bruce."

Recently the town has begun to create a network of walking trails that encompasses much of the town's existing infrastructure of walking paths. Known as the heritage trail, it spans a large part of the town, and its waterside parks.

In 2005, Chesley was able to open a Heritage and Woodworking Museum due to a Ontario Trillium Foundation grant. The museum was housed in the Dawson House on 1st Avenue, formerly the home of town doctors Stewart and Dawson. The building had been left to the town for public use in the 1970s; in 2013, Chesley put Dawson House up for sale.

Notable people
Paul MacDermid, National Hockey League player 1981–1995
Mickey MacKay, Hockey Hall of Fame, played 1914–1930
Victoria Pratt, actress

References

Former towns in Ontario
Communities in Bruce County